The Armadillo is a 4 wheeled armoured personnel carrier (APC) designed and solely operated by Guatemala. It was designed and built in 1981 in response to difficulties in obtaining American made military vehicles due to the ongoing civil war. It was inspired by the Cadillac Gage Commando.

References

Wheeled armoured personnel carriers
Military vehicles introduced in the 1980s
Armoured personnel carriers of Guatemala